Kerstin Anderson (born September 10, 1994) is an American stage actress and singer. She starred as Maria Von Trapp in the 2015 U.S. national tour of The Sound of Music, for which she received warm praise.  She made her Broadway debut as the alternate for Eliza Doolittle in the 2018 revival of My Fair Lady.

Early life and education
Anderson was raised in South Burlington, Vermont, the daughter of Frederick G. "Ted" Anderson, a scientist with IBM, and Kathleen "Kathy" Kilcoyne, a college athletic director. She lived in Galway, Ireland, during her father's sabbatical year, and her interest in acting began when her sister appeared in a play there. She grew up singing but never took it seriously until high school. While attending South Burlington High School, she played the title role in Peter Pan (2010) with the nearby Lyric Theatre Company, and in high school productions, she played Asaka in Once on This Island (2011) and Elle Woods in Legally Blonde (2012). As a junior in high school, she directed the first musical, You're a Good Man, Charlie Brown (2011), given by a new community theatre company, Spotted Pup Productions. She then played Heidi in their production of [title of show] (2012). She also competed on the high school's dance team, which won the state championship her junior year.

After graduating from high school in 2013, Anderson attended Pace University. During her two years there, she starred as Clara in the university's production of The Light in the Piazza, directed by Victoria Clark, and as Annie in The Visit. During her summer break in 2014, Anderson played Shy in the Forestburgh Playhouse production of The Best Little Whorehouse in Texas. Anderson interrupted her education after her sophomore year when she was cast as Maria Von Trapp in the 2015–2017 national tour of The Sound of Music. She stated in an interview that she might return to Pace, after the tour finished, while continuing her career.

The Sound of Music
The national tour began in September 2015. Anderson saw the 1965 film version of The Sound of Music as a child on VHS tape. She recalled visiting Stowe, Vermont as a child, where the real Maria Von Trapp and her family settled in the U.S. and built the Trapp Family Lodge.

Reviews of Anderson's performances as Maria were strongly positive. Jordan Riefe of The Hollywood Reporter wrote, "Her crisp, clear soprano voice isn’t the strongest in the cast, but Anderson makes a fine fit for the tricky role." Margaret Gray of the Los Angeles Times commented, "Anderson takes charge with a spirit so joyful, a physicality so lithe and coltish, and a soprano so flawlessly soaring, that only Frau Schraeder ... could possibly resist her charm." Tim Smith of The Baltimore Sun agreed: "She shines right from her first scene.... She is ... persuasive an actor, effortlessly connecting with the children and making Maria's spiritual struggle register. She is especially adept at conveying Maria's gradual falling in love with von Trapp". In Variety, Bob Verini commented that Anderson has a "natural glow (though she ... seems to have no control over her hands)".

Broadway
Anderson made her Broadway debut as Eliza in the 2018 Broadway revival of My Fair Lady.  Originally an understudy for the role, she became the alternate for Saturday matinée performances beginning on July 8, 2018, with Lauren Ambrose continuing on other nights.  By late October, Anderson switched to Tuesday nights, continuing as an alternate during Laura Benanti's term as Eliza.

References

American musical theatre actresses
American sopranos
Musicians from Vermont
Living people
1994 births
Actresses from Vermont
21st-century American women